Thórir 'the Silent' Rögnvaldsson was a ninth-century Viking and the second Jarl of Møre.

Family background
Thórir was the son of Rǫgnvaldr Eysteinsson, first jarl of Møre and close friend of King Harald Fairhair, and Hildr Hrólfsdóttir, a jarl's daughter and skald in her own right.

Ívarr accompanied their father on campaign in support of King Harald Fairhair and was slain in battle in the early 870s. Rǫgnvaldr does not appear to have ever assumed the title and instead determined that his brother Sigurd should have it, which King Harald agreed to and Sigurd was installed as the Jarl of Orkney. Einarr, Thórir's half-brother, better known by the nickname , became the fourth Jarl of Orkney and established a direct bloodline that would rule for several hundred years.

Snorri went on to assert that  was none other than the famed Rollo, who became the first ruler of Normandy – after emerging as an outstanding warrior among the Norsemen who had secured a permanent foothold on Frankish soil in the valley of the lower Seine – and progenitor of the House of Normandy. These claims contradict the French- and Norman-origin texts composed in the centuries prior to Snorri's work in the 1200s and are heavily contested.

Jarl of Møre 
Gudrød took possession of the lands of  while Hálfdan sailed west towards Orkney to overthrow Torf-Einarr. King Harald, apparently horrified by the actions of his sons, dispossessed  and restored 's possessions to Thórir. In 892, Thórir assumed his role as jarl of Møre.

Issue

Landnámabók attests two illegitimate children of Thórir by unnamed women:
 , mentioned as Thórir's other illegitimate child alongside 

Outside of the Norse tradition, he also charged with the paternity of:

 Thorbard av Møre (later Herbert de la Mare), who is said to have married Griselle, the daughter of Rollo and Gisela of France.
 Ljot av Møre, who would be the father of Bård Nesjekonge
 Oluffa
 Armond

References

Viking warriors
Orkneyinga saga characters
9th-century Vikings